Anthony Nicholas Seymour Hampton (born April 1967) is a British businessman and the chief executive officer (CEO) of Tate & Lyle since April 2018.

Early life
Hampton has a master's degree in chemistry from St John's College, Oxford.

Career
Prior to joining Tate & Lyle, Hampton held a number of senior roles over a twenty-year career at PepsiCo, rising to senior vice president and chief financial officer, Europe in 2008, a position he held until 2013 when he was appointed PepsiCo's president, West Europe region and senior vice president commercial, Europe. He joined Tate & Lyle as chief financial officer in 2014.

In January 2018, it was announced that Javed Ahmed would retire as CEO effective 1 April 2018, and Hampton would succeed him as CEO.

References

Living people
Alumni of St John's College, Oxford
British chief executives
British chief financial officers
1967 births
Tate & Lyle people